Merville, officially Barangay Merville, is a barangay in Parañaque, is part of Parañaque's 16 barangays, and is part of District 2. It is a gated residential community in the northeast of the city, which was created on April 3, 1978 out of Barangay La Huerta under Presidential Decree No. 1325.

Merville is bordered to the east by the city of Taguig, as well as barangays San Martín de Porres and Moonwalk, to the south are the barangays of Sun Valley and Don Bosco, and to the north is the city of Pasay.

== Government ==
Merville is led by barangay captain Edgar G. Caballero.

Population 
Starting in 1980, the population of Merville has been counted once every 5 years except in 2007 when it was carried out on August 1.

Merville's inhabitants make up 4.13% of Parañaque's overall population and the PSA stopped checking the number of households and household populations after 2000.

There was no population census in 1985 due to Political and economic problems and there was no population census in 2005 due to Budget issues although a population census was done 2 years later.

References 



Barangays of Metro Manila
Parañaque
Gated communities in the Philippines
1978 establishments in the Philippines